Taniya Bhatia (born 28 November 1997) is an Indian cricketer. She is primarily a wicket-keeper. She plays for Punjab and India. She is currently trained under coach RP Singh. The International Cricket Council (ICC) named Bhatia as one of the five breakout stars in women's cricket in 2018.

Early life 
She was born to Sapna and Sanjay Bhatia in Chandigarh. Her father works in Central Bank of India and had played cricket at the all India university level. She has an elder sister Sanjana and younger brother Sehaj.

Earlier, Bhatia trained under former Indian cricketer and Yuvraj Singh’s father Yograj Singh while she was studying at DAV Senior Secondary School. She is currently studying BA-II at MCM DAV College for Women. Bhatia's father was himself a cricket player and so was her uncle. Her brother too has joined the U-19 cricket team.

Early career
After her DAV academy days, she became the youngest girl to represent Punjab in U19 at the young age of 11. She soon joined the senior state team at the age of 16.

At the age of 13, Bhatia became the youngest player to play for the senior Punjab team in the inter-state domestic tournament in 2011. In 2015, she captained the U-19 North Zone side in the inter-zonal cricket tournament in Guwahati. In the game she also scored 227 runs and also responsible for 10 dismissals. She joined India A squad, when she turned 16. She went on a professional slump for two years which almost made her lose her interest in cricket altogether. She overcame it with the support of her mother which motivated her to pursue her dreams.

International career
She made her Women's Twenty20 International cricket (WT20I) debut for India Women against South Africa Women on 13 February 2018. Bhatia is the first woman cricketer from Chandigarh to be a part of the national team. Bhatia wears jersey No 28 in the team. She made her Women's One Day International (WODI) debut against Sri Lanka on 11 September 2018.

In October 2018, she was named in India's squad for the 2018 ICC Women's World Twenty20 tournament in the West Indies.  In January 2020, she was named in India's squad for the 2020 ICC Women's T20 World Cup in Australia.

In May 2021, she was named in India's Test squad for their one-off match against the England women's cricket team. Bhatia made her Test debut on 16 June 2021, for India against England. In January 2022, she was named in India's team for the 2022 Women's Cricket World Cup in New Zealand. In July 2022, she was named in India's team for the cricket tournament at the 2022 Commonwealth Games in Birmingham, England.

References

External links

 
 

1997 births
Living people
Indian women cricketers
India women Test cricketers
India women One Day International cricketers
India women Twenty20 International cricketers
People from Chandigarh
Punjab, India women cricketers
North Zone women cricketers
IPL Supernovas cricketers
Delhi Capitals (WPL) cricketers
Cricketers at the 2022 Commonwealth Games
Commonwealth Games silver medallists for India
Commonwealth Games medallists in cricket
Medallists at the 2022 Commonwealth Games